The Hunloke Baronetcy, of Wingerworth in the County of Derby, was a title in the Baronetage of England. It was created on 28 February 1643 by King Charles I for Sir Henry Hunloke, of Wingerworth, near Chesterfield, Derbyshire. Hunloke was a loyal royalist who had been knighted by the King on the battlefield of the Battle of Edgehill the previous year. The baronetcy passed from father to son until the death of the sixth Baronet in 1856. The latter was succeeded by his uncle, upon whose death in  1856 the baronetcy became extinct. The second Baronet was High Sheriff of Derbyshire in 1687 and the sixth Baronet in 1840. 

The family wealth arose from collieries, ironworks and quarries on their  Derbyshire estate. Wingerworth Hall, the family seat from the 16th century, was demolished in the 1920s and the estate was broken up and later redeveloped for housing.

Hunloke baronets, of Wingerworth (1643)
 Sir Henry Hunloke, 1st Baronet (1618–1648)
 Sir Henry Hunloke, 2nd Baronet (1645–1715)
 Sir Thomas Windsor Hunloke, 3rd Baronet (1684–1752)
 Sir Henry Hunloke, 4th Baronet (1724–1804)
 Sir Thomas Windsor Hunloke, 5th Baronet (1773–1816)
 Sir Henry John Joseph Hunloke, 6th Baronet (1812–1856)
 Sir James Hunloke, 7th Baronet (1784–1856)

References
 Debrett's Baronetage of England, 7th Edition (1839), p. 643 (Google Books)
 

Extinct baronetcies in the Baronetage of England
History of Derbyshire